"Ísjaki" (Icelandic for "Iceberg", pronounced ) is a song written and recorded by Icelandic post-rock band Sigur Rós for their seventh studio album Kveikur. It appears as the third track on the album. "Ísjaki" was released to Icelandic contemporary hit radio as a promotional single from Kveikur on April 24, 2013. It was later released early on the Kveikur album listing on iTunes on April 25, 2013.

A lyric video for the song was also released on April 24, 2013.

Track listing

Personnel
Adapted from Kveikur liner notes.

Sigur Rós
Jón Þór Birgisson – vocals, guitar
Georg Hólm – bass
Orri Páll Dýrason – drums

Additional musicians
Eiríkur Orri Ólafsson - brass arrangement
Daníel Bjarnason - string arrangement
Sigrún Jónsdóttir - brass
Eiríkur Orri Ólafsson - brass
Bergrún Snæbjörnsdóttir - brass
Borgar Magnason - strings
Margrét Árnadóttir - strings
Pálína Árnadóttir - strings
Una Sveinbjarnardóttir - strings
Þórunn Ósk Marinósdóttir - strings

Additional personnel
Ted Jensen - mastering
Rich Costey - mixing
Alex Somers - mixing, recording
Elisabeth Carlsson - assistant mixing
Eric Isip - assistant mixing
Chris Kasych - assistant mixing 
Laura Sisk - assistant mixing
Birgir Jón Birgisson - recording
Valgeir Sigurdsson - recording (strings)

Charts

Release history

References

Sigur Rós songs
2013 singles
XL Recordings singles
2013 songs
Songs written by Jónsi
Songs written by Orri Páll Dýrason
Songs written by Georg Hólm
Icelandic-language songs